Lentinus strigosus is a species of fungus in the family Polyporaceae. It is edible when young, but becomes very tough with age.

Taxonomy

The species was first described by Lewis David de Schweinitz in 1822 as Agaricus strigosus.

Description
The expanded cap is semi-vase-shaped with an inrolled edge, usually purple then fading to brownish. The flesh is white, thin, and tough. The gills are close, narrow, and cap-coloured then whitish. The stipe is short, lateral and hairy. The taste is often bitter. The spores are white and smooth.

Similar species
Phyllotopsis nidulans is similar, but is orange-yellow and has a poor odour.

See also 

 Hexacyclinol

References

External links

Polyporaceae
Edible fungi
Fungi of North America
Taxa named by Elias Magnus Fries
Fungi described in 1825